Eugen Horniak, or Evžen Horňák (August 28, 1926 in Ružindol – October 6, 2004 in Bratislava) was a Czechoslovak/Slovak basketball player who competed in the 1952 Summer Olympics.

He was part of the Czechoslovak basketball team, which was eliminated in the first round of the 1952 Olympic tournament. He played all three matches.

References

1926 births
2004 deaths
People from Trnava District
Sportspeople from the Trnava Region
Czechoslovak men's basketball players
Slovak men's basketball players
Olympic basketball players of Czechoslovakia
Basketball players at the 1952 Summer Olympics